Karl Otto Paetel (23 November 1906 – 4 May 1975) was a German political journalist. During the 1920s, he was a prominent exponent of National Bolshevism. During the 1930s, he became a member of anti-Nazi German resistance.

Biography
Paetel was born on 23 November 1906 in Berlin. He attended the Siemens-Oberrealschule where he got involved in the Köngener Bund youth group. He later studied at the Friedrich-Wilhelm University of Berlin.

Paetel was involved in the German Youth Movement and became a prominent leader in the Deutsche Freischar that formed part of it. He belonged to its "national revolutionary" tendency, which sought to marry elements of both the radical left and the radical right in order to form a Third Position between the Nazi Party and the Communist Party of Germany. To this end he established his own Arbeitsring Junge Front and subsequently the Group of Social-Revolutionary Nationalists to promulgate his syncretic views. The latter group was established in 1930 due to his disillusionment with the Nazi Party, a group he had hitherto been well disposed towards, as he felt that their revolutionary rhetoric was insincere and that their essential nature was conservative. Nonetheless, he felt that the Nazi Party still contained "useful" revolutionary elements and was particularly active in attempting to win over members of the Hitler Youth to his side. In 1930 he became co-editor of Die Kommenden with prominent nationalist Ernst Jünger.

After escaping from internment by the French police in May 1940, he fled via southern France to Spain, and then to New York. There, he resumed his journalistic activities and worked as a correspondent. In 1943, he married his fiancée Elisabeth Zerner. After the war, he edited the magazine Deutsche Gegenwart and wrote about Jünger. In 1975, he died in Forest Hills, Queens, in New York City.

Selected bibliography 
 The National Bolshevist Manifesto, 1933

References

German male journalists
1975 deaths
German resistance members
National Bolsheviks
1906 births
German male writers
20th-century German journalists
German emigrants to the United States
German Youth Movement
Conservative Revolutionary movement